C. Michael Sperberg-McQueen is an American markup language specialist. He was co-editor of the Extensible Markup Language (XML) 1.0 spec (1998), and chair of the XML Schema working group.

Biography

He was also instrumental in the Text Encoding Initiative (TEI), an international cooperative project to develop and disseminate guidelines for the encoding and interchange of electronic text for research.  He was co-editor, with Lou Burnard, of the TEI's Guidelines for Electronic Text Encoding and Interchange in 1994. He also served as editor in chief of the TEI from 1988 to 2000.

XML and TEI have become ubiquitous in their domains. Sue Polanka (Head of Reference/Instruction, Wright State University Libraries) notes that the TEI "...in the 1980s and 90s established a fundamental set of methods and practices that now underpin most digital humanities scholarship" Sperberg-McQueen has been a key leader of these and other standards efforts through extensive speaking, teaching, writing, and research.

He holds a Ph.D. in comparative literature from Stanford University, and has taught and published widely on markup systems, overlapping markup, formal languages, semantic theory, and other topics.

In 2015, Sperberg-McQueen held courses on Digital Humanities at the Technische Universität Darmstadt as visiting professor. He also talked in an interview about his work experience for the Princeton University and the Symbiose of computers and humanities.

References

 http://www.w3.org/People/cmsmcq/ – Home page at the Web Consortium
 http://cmsmcq.com/ – personal Web page, with selected publications at http://cmsmcq.com/doclist.html
 http://www.gca.org/papers/xmleurope2001/papers/bio/s02-1auth1.html—bio from XML Europe 2001 conference
 http://findarticles.com/p/articles/mi_m0EIN/is_2003_Dec_10/ai_111110786/ -- "XML Cup 2003 Awards Presented"

Year of birth missing (living people)
Living people
American computer programmers
World Wide Web Consortium
Stanford University alumni
Linguists
XML Guild
Text Encoding Initiative
Academic staff of Technische Universität Darmstadt
People in digital humanities